Lawrence Sheldon Strulović (name later anglicized to Strulovitch) (born 11 July 1959), best known as Lawrence Stroll, is a Canadian billionaire businessman, part-owner and executive chairman of Aston Martin, and the owner of the Aston Martin F1 Team. According to Forbes, he has a net worth of US$2.9 billion, .

Early life
He was born to a Jewish family in Montreal, Quebec, the son of fashion importer Leo Strulovitch.

Career
Stroll's father brought Pierre Cardin fashionwear and Ralph Lauren clothing to Canada.
Stroll later took the Ralph Lauren brand to Europe.

Along with Hong Kong investor Silas Chou, Stroll invested in clothing designers Tommy Hilfiger and Michael Kors, and the pair largely contributed to the brands' growth to global prevalence. Stroll's company, Sportswear Holdings, sold the last of its stake in these businesses in 2014. During the 2000s, Chou and Stroll also invested in Asprey & Garrard.

From 2000 until August 2022, Stroll owned a Canadian race car circuit, known as Circuit Mont-Tremblant, in Quebec's Laurentian Mountains.

In August 2018, Stroll led a consortium of investors in buying the Force India Formula One team. Renamed Racing Point Force India, and as a new team officially, they re-entered midway through the 2018 Formula One season and achieved 7th position in the Constructors' Championship. For the  season, the team name and entrant was changed once again to Racing Point F1 Team, with Stroll's son Lance driving one of the cars, finishing in 7th position in the Constructors' Championship once again.

On 31 January 2020, it was announced that Stroll led the Yew Tree Investments consortium to invest £182 million into Aston Martin, in return for a 16.7% stake in the company. Aston Martin signed Fernando Alonso for the 2023 F1 season.

Personal life
Stroll is married to Raquel Stroll ( Diniz). He was previously married to Belgian-born Claire-Anne Stroll ( Callens). Lawrence and Claire-Anne have two children. Their son Lance Stroll is a racing driver who is currently competing in  Formula One. Their daughter is Chloe Stroll.

Stroll has a large car collection, mostly consisting of Ferraris, from the Ferrari 250 GTO to the latest LaFerrari. He used to own the Ferrari dealership of Quebec. He also owns other cars such as McLarens and a Ford GT.

References

1959 births
Living people
Canadian billionaires
Canadian expatriates in Switzerland
Canadian car collectors
Canadian people of Jewish descent
Canadian people of Serbian descent
Businesspeople from Montreal
Formula One people
Formula One team owners
Aston Martin
Automotive businesspeople
Sports car racing team owners
Racing Point F1 Team